Waitematā and Gulf Ward is an Auckland Council ward which elects one councillor and covers the Great Barrier, Waiheke, and Waitematā Local Boards. The current councillor is Mike Lee.

Demographics

Waitematā and Gulf ward had a population of 92,865 at the 2018 New Zealand census, an increase of 6,450 people (7.5%) since the 2013 census, and an increase of 21,246 people (29.7%) since the 2006 census. There were 38,712 households, comprising 46,767 males and 46,101 females, giving a sex ratio of 1.01 males per female. The median age was 32.2 years (compared with 37.4 years nationally), with 9,390 people (10.1%) aged under 15 years, 31,755 (34.2%) aged 15 to 29, 43,053 (46.4%) aged 30 to 64, and 8,667 (9.3%) aged 65 or older.

Ethnicities were 63.4% European/Pākehā, 6.7% Māori, 4.8% Pacific peoples, 28.5% Asian, and 5.6% other ethnicities. People may identify with more than one ethnicity.

The percentage of people born overseas was 48.6, compared with 27.1% nationally.

Although some people chose not to answer the census's question about religious affiliation, 55.0% had no religion, 27.9% were Christian, 0.3% had Māori religious beliefs, 4.4% were Hindu, 2.2% were Muslim, 2.2% were Buddhist and 3.0% had other religions.

Of those at least 15 years old, 37,311 (44.7%) people had a bachelor's or higher degree, and 4,566 (5.5%) people had no formal qualifications. The median income was $38,600, compared with $31,800 nationally. 22,119 people (26.5%) earned over $70,000 compared to 17.2% nationally. The employment status of those at least 15 was that 45,783 (54.8%) people were employed full-time, 13,071 (15.7%) were part-time, and 3,450 (4.1%) were unemployed.

Councillors

Election Results 
Election Results for the Waitematā and Gulf Ward:

2022 Election Results

References

Wards of the Auckland Region